Lieutenant General Sven August Wilhelm Colliander (23 May 1890 – 16 September 1961) was a Swedish Army officer and horse rider who competed in the 1928 and 1936 Summer Olympics.

Early life
Colliander was born on 23 May 1890 in Halmstad, Sweden, the son of C Alb Colliander and his wife Nathalia Noreen.

Career

Military career
Colliander was commissioned as an officer in the Scanian Hussar Regiment (K 5) with the rank of underlöjtnant in 1910. He was promoted to Captain in 1925 and served as a general staff officer from 1925 to 1928, and was promoted to Major in 1933. Colliander served as commanding officer of the Swedish Army Riding School from 1934 to 1940 and he was promoted to Lieutenant Colonel in 1937. He was then promoted to Colonel and appointed commanding officer of the Norrland Dragoon Regiment (K 4) in 1940. Three years later Colliander was appointed acting military commander of the I Military District and in 1946 he was promoted to major general and appointed military commander of the VI Military District. Colliander served in this position for five years and in 1951 he was appointed military commander of the III Military District. In 1955 he was promoted to Lieutenant General and retired from active service.

Sports career
In 1928 he finished 13th in the individual eventing on the horse King, and his eventing team was unplaced. Eight years later he and his horse Kål XX were part of the Swedish dressage team that won the bronze medal, after finishing eleventh in the individual competition.

Personal life
In 1914, he married Carin Wernersson (born 1893), the daughter of Wilhelm Wernersson and Anna Törnquist.

Dates of rank
1910 – Underlöjtnant
19?? – Lieutenant
1925 – Captain
1933 – Major
1937 – Lieutenant colonel
1940 – Colonel
1946 – Major general
1955 – Lieutenant general

References

1890 births
1961 deaths
Swedish dressage riders
Olympic equestrians of Sweden
Swedish male equestrians
Equestrians at the 1928 Summer Olympics
Equestrians at the 1936 Summer Olympics
Olympic bronze medalists for Sweden
Olympic medalists in equestrian
Swedish Army lieutenant generals
People from Halmstad
Medalists at the 1936 Summer Olympics
20th-century Swedish military personnel
Sportspeople from Halland County